Queen Ann (–1723) appears in Virginia records between 1706 and 1718 as ruler of the Pamunkey tribe of Virginia.  Ann continued her predecessors' efforts to keep peace with the colony of Virginia.

She became the leader of her tribe after Queen Betty, in 1708 or before. Queen Ann is first mentioned in 1708. Prior to that the Weroansqua of the Pamunkey was Queen Betty who succeeded her aunt Cockacoeske in 1686. Cockacoeske, Betty, and Anne are often confused with each other. It is certain that Cockacoeske was not the same as Anne; Cockecoeske is well documented to have died in 1686.

It has been suggested that Queen Ann and Queen Betty may have been the same person:

Ann's last record in history was in 1715, when she was noted as visiting the colonial authorities in Virginia. She had come to seek fair treatment for her tribe, who suffered encroachment and raids by settlers. The Pamunkey had, in spite of Totopotomoi's sacrifice, been treated poorly by the Virginian settlers in the intervening years. Ann attempted to protect the survival of her people by petitioning to halt the sale of tribal land to outsiders, and halt the sale of liquor to members of the tribe.

Ann had a son, whom she sent to the Indian school at the College of William and Mary in 1711.  He was sent as part of an agreement with the governor of Virginia: if her son and another Pamunkey child were sent to the Indian school, the tribe's debt would be forgiven. Ann's son's name is not known as many records were either not kept or were destroyed by war and time.

Ann is believed to have died around 1723.

References

Further reading
 
 
 
 
 
 

1650s births
1710s deaths
Female Native American leaders
People of the Powhatan Confederacy
17th-century women rulers
18th-century women rulers
Tribal chiefs
Pamunkey people
17th-century Native American women
18th-century Native American women
18th-century Native Americans